Stephenson County is a county located in the U.S. state of Illinois. According to the 2020 United States Census, it had a population of 44,630. Its county seat is Freeport.

Stephenson County is included in the Freeport, IL Micropolitan Statistical Area, which is also included in the Rockford-Freeport-Rochelle, IL Combined Statistical Area.

History
The land that became Stephenson County was first settled by William Waddams in 1832, who founded Waddams Grove. By 1837, population was sufficient to form Stephenson County, taking land from Jo Daviess and Winnebago counties. The county was named for Colonel Benjamin Stephenson, an official of the Illinois Territory.

Geography

Climate and weather

Adjacent counties

 Green County, Wisconsin (north)
 Winnebago County (east)
 Ogle County (southeast)
 Carroll County (southwest)
 Jo Daviess County (west)
 Lafayette County, Wisconsin (northwest)

Major highways

  US Highway 20
  Illinois Route 26
  Illinois Route 73
  Illinois Route 75

Demographics

As of the 2010 United States Census, there were 47,711 people, 19,845 households, and 13,015 families residing in the county. The racial makeup of the county was 86.5% white, 9.0% black or African American, 0.6% Asian, 0.2% American Indian, 1.2% from other races, and 2.5% from two or more races. Those of Hispanic or Latino origin made up 2.9% of the population. In terms of ancestry, 46.6% were German, 12.5% were Irish, 10.0% were English, and 8.0% were American.

Of the 19,845 households, 28.6% had children under the age of 18 living with them, 50.3% were married couples living together, 11.2% had a female householder with no husband present, 34.4% were non-families, and 29.7% of all households were made up of individuals. The average household size was 2.36 and the average family size was 2.90. The median age was 43.1 years.

The median income for a household in the county was $43,304 and the median income for a family was $54,224. Males had a median income of $41,672 versus $29,510 for females. The per capita income for the county was $22,608. About 12.3% of families and 14.8% of the population were below the poverty line, including 24.1% of those under age 18 and 7.3% of those age 65 or over.

Education
There are five public high schools and one private high Schools in the county: (approximate enrollment included)

Public high schools
 Freeport High 1,254
 Lena-Winslow High 299
 Dakota High 254
 Pearl City High 150
 Orangeville High 142

Private high school
 Aquin Catholic High 93

Communities

City
 Freeport

Town
 Dakota

Villages

 Cedarville
 Davis
 German Valley
 Lena
 Orangeville
 Pearl City
 Ridott
 Rock City
 Winslow

Census-designated places
 Baileyville (part)
 Lake Summerset
 Willow Lake

Unincorporated communities

 Afolkey
 Bolton
 Buckhorn Corners
 Buena Vista
 Damascus
 Eleroy
 Evarts
 Florence
 Kent
 Loran
 McConnell
 Oneco
 Red Oak
 Rock Grove
 Scioto Mills
 Waddams Grove
 Winneshiek
 Yellow Creek

Townships

 Buckeye
 Dakota
 Erin
 Florence
 Freeport
 Harlem
 Jefferson
 Kent
 Lancaster
 Loran
 Oneco
 Ridott
 Rock Grove
 Rock Run
 Silver Creek
 Waddams
 West Point
 Winslow

Historic Sites

 Kellogg's Grove

Politics

See also

 List of counties in Illinois
 List of Illinois county name etymologies
 National Register of Historic Places listings in Stephenson County, Illinois

References

External links
 Stephenson County
 Benjamin Stephenson House Restoration Project
 Stephenson County Historical Society & Museum
 Freeport/Stephenson County Convention and Visitors Bureau
 Illinois Ancestors Stephenson Tombstone Project
 Genealogy Trails for Stephenson County
 Illinois High School Association – School Enrollments

 
1837 establishments in Illinois
Illinois counties
Populated places established in 1837